Tar (also Romanized as Ţār) is a village in Tarq Rud Rural District, in the Central District of Natanz County, Isfahan Province, Iran. At the 2006 census, its population was 259, in 110 families.

Tar, in the word translates to (Parthian Pahlavi) "hidden heaven".

History 
The old building, which is called Baba Abdullah Mausoleum, was the first fire temple in which the Zoroastrian practise of fire worship could be practiced by the priests who were tasked with keeping the temple fire to burn without interpretation, similarly to the Olympic torch which is tended to in order for its flame to remain ever-burning. After the eventual discovery of Tar Village, this fire temple was renamed Baba-Abdullah in fear for it being destroyed under the guise was existing as a non-Islamic institution of worship. The original name of this fire temple is unknown. Upon the arrival of the Arab conquest there was also a change of its role, possibly into a mosque, before it was abandoned. Nader Shah the Great was also known to pass through this place during intentions in fighting the Afghans tribes within the region. Tar has been the summer resort of Safavid kings, including Shah Abbas Safavid.

References 

Populated places in Natanz County